Days of Innocence is the debut studio album by Australian band, Moving Pictures in October 1981. It spent 7 weeks at the top of the Australian Album charts in 1982 and was certified 3× Platinum. It spawned the 1982 number one single in Australia "What About Me".

Track listing
"Nothing to Do" (Alex Smith, Garry Frost) - 3:28 
"What About Me" (Garry Frost, Frances Swan Frost) - 3:32
"Round Again" (A. Smith, G. Frost) - 4:06
"Bustin' Loose" (A. Smith) - 4:37
"Wings" (A. Smith) - 4:53
"The Angel and the Madman" (A. Smith, Charlie Cole, G. Frost) - 4:28
"Sweet Cherie" (A. Smith, C. Cole, G. Frost) - 3:38
"So Tired" (A. Smith) - 4:03
"Joni and the Romeo" (A. Smith) - 3:31
"Streetheart" (A. Smith, Ian Lees, C. Cole, Andrew Thompson, G. Frost, Paul Freeland) - 7:01

Musicians
Alex Smith - Vocals
Garry Frost - Guitar, Backing vocals
Andrew Thompson - Saxophones
Charlie Cole - Keyboards, Trumpet, Backing vocals
Ian Lees - Bass
Paul Freeland - Drums

Charts

Weekly charts

Year-end charts

Certifications

References

1981 debut albums
Moving Pictures (band) albums
Epic Records albums
CBS Records albums
Polydor Records albums
Sony Records albums
Albums produced by Charles Fisher (producer)